The 2011–12 Norfolk State Spartans men's basketball team represented Norfolk State University during the 2011–12 NCAA Division I men's basketball season. The Spartans, led by fifth year head coach Anthony Evans, played their home games at Joseph G. Echols Memorial Hall and are members of the Mid-Eastern Athletic Conference. They finished the season 26–10, 13–3 in MEAC play to finish in second place. They were the champions of the MEAC Basketball tournament to earn the conference's automatic bid in the 2012 NCAA tournament, the school's first ever appearance in the tournament. As a 15 seed, the Spartans shocked the 2 seed Missouri in the second round, 86–84. This was only the fifth time in NCAA Tournament history that a 15 seed defeated a 2 seed, with the last coming in 2001 (later that same day, 15 seed Lehigh defeated 2 seed Duke). Norfolk State would fall to Florida in the second round.

Roster

Schedule

|-
!colspan=9| Regular season

|-
!colspan=9| 2012 MEAC men's basketball tournament

|-
!colspan=9| 2012 NCAA tournament

References

Norfolk State Spartans men's basketball seasons
Norfolk State
Norfolk State
Norfolk State Spartans
Norfolk State Spartans